Pervomaysky is a rural locality (a khutor) in Abadzekhskoye Rural Settlement of Maykopsky District, Russia. The population was 1242 as of 2018. There are 22 streets.

Geography 
Pervomaysky is located 15 km south of Tulsky (the district's administrative centre) by road. Vesyoly is the nearest rural locality.

References 

Rural localities in Maykopsky District